Castor is a town in Alberta, Canada. It has an elevation .

Castor is French (also Latin) for beaver. The town is known for its duck and geese migration in the fall since its territory includes many stopping points well frequented by migrating waterfowl.

History 

Castor was incorporated on July 13, 1910.

Demographics 

In the 2016 Census of Population conducted by Statistics Canada, the Town of Castor recorded a population of 929 living in 419 of its 448 total private dwellings, a  change from its 2011 population of 932.

Tourism 
Castor's tourism peaks during the summer months. Each year Castor's lake like creek that wraps around the north-east end of the town, is a large drawing point for visitors. This one of a kind creek is framed by sandstone cliffs, and a visit will usually be filled with numerous wildlife sightings. The creek is one of the best places on the Alberta prairies for Kayaking and paddle-boarding. Other creek activities include motor-boating and swimming. On dry years natural beaches form at the base of some of the cliffs, giving visitors opportunities to dock their kayaks, during parts of creek. In addition to the creek, the town hosts many museums, including the towns original hospital dating back to 1911, the Machine Shed Museum, the Pharmacy Museum housed in the towns original drug store, the Beaver School Museum, the historic All Saints Anglican Church, the Grain Elevator Historical Site, and the Train Station Museum.

Economy 
The town's main industries are agriculture, mining and oil and gas services.

Infrastructure 
Castor is home to the Our Lady of the Rosary Hospital.

Education 
The Town of Castor has two schools, one Public named Gus Wetter School and one Catholic named Theresetta Catholic School. A source of humour for those familiar with Castor is the name of Gus Wetter's school men's sports teams: The Castor Raiders.

Media 
The local newspaper is the Castor Advance covering news events occurring in Castor as well as neighbouring communities.

Literature 
W. O. Mitchell was a teacher in Castor when he wrote Who Has Seen the Wind.

Notable people 
 Darcy Tucker, former professional hockey player

See also 
List of communities in Alberta
List of towns in Alberta

References

External links 

1909 establishments in Alberta
County of Paintearth No. 18
Towns in Alberta